Tyringham is a town in Berkshire County, Massachusetts. It is part of the Pittsfield, Massachusetts Metropolitan Statistical Area. The population was 427 at the 2020 census.

History 
Founded as Housatonic Township Number 1, the land which became Tyringham and Monterey was first settled in 1735. Tyringham was established in 1739. The two main villages were set up along two waterways, Hop Brook to the north and the Konkapot River to the south.

In 1750, Adonijah Bidwell, a Yale Divinity School graduate from the Hartford region, became the first minister of Township No. 1. When a meetinghouse was founded in the south, it led to a buildup in the north, and by 1762 the town was incorporated. The origins of the town name are somewhat disputed, with some sources claiming it was named for Tyringham, a village in Buckinghamshire, England, and others asserting it was named by Sir Francis Bernard, the former governor of the Massachusetts Bay Colony, after a woman, Jane Beresford (adopted by John Tyringham), from whom he had inherited an estate. If the latter, it would be the only town in Massachusetts named after a woman.

The town was home to the Tyringham Shaker Settlement Historic District, with the Shaker holy name of "Jerusalem", which lay just south of the town center. The town of Monterey was set off and incorporated as its own town in 1847.

Tyringham celebrated its bicentennial in August, 1939 with a two day celebration and a 31 unit parade.

The Stedman Rake Factory located in town made rakes for several American Presidents, including Theodore Roosevelt, William Howard Taft, Warren G. Harding, Calvin Coolidge, and Herbert Hoover.

The town was the site of several small country estates for notable wealthy families. Today, Tyringham is a small, rural community.

Economy 

The town of Tyringham began with an agricultural economy which soon shifted to include cottage industries and manufacturing. 
In 1786, the town had 182 dwelling houses, forty shops, two tanneries, four potash works, two iron works, and four grist and saw mills. The townspeople made 1185 barrels of cider that year. More than ten thousand acres of the uplands were woodlands or unimproved land, but about 2500 acres had been improved for tillage. About two thousand acres were mowed for hay, and more than three thousand acres were used as pasturage for the townspeople's five hundred horses, eight hundred swine, 178 oxen, five hundred cattle, and 541 milk cows.

By 1837, Tyringham farmers had incorporated sheep into their economy and owned 1678 Merino sheep as well as 598 sheep of other breeds, and produced more than 6500 pounds of wool. One tannery was still in operation. Their manufactories made boots, shoes, iron castings, forks, wooden ware, palm-leaf hats, rakes, chairs, and corn brooms. The biggest business, a paper mill, employed seven men and nineteen women, and made fifty tons of paper valued at $21,000.

Over the next three decades, Tyringham farmers diversified further, though they maintained about 1800 acres for making hay. In 1865, 63 farms employed 200, and their tillage produced Indian corn, rye, barley, buckwheat, oats, and corn. Vegetable crops included potatoes, turnips, onions, carrots, and cabbage. Most of their crops were suited to the chilly climate and short growing season of a hilltown. The Shakers raised garden seeds, devoting only three acres to those crops but selling the seeds for $2,000. Someone devoted five acres to tobacco and raised nine thousand pounds valued at $1,800. Tyringham farmers had also brought 1800 apple trees and fifty pear trees into production. Their livestock had declined in numbers, but their 317 milk cows gave enough milk to make 8,000 pounds of butter and 40,000 pounds of cheese which sold for $8,000. Tyringham farmers also sold more than a hundred thousand pounds of dressed beef, pork, mutton, veal, and pork. They also made five thousand pounds of maple sugar and four hundred gallons of maple molasses valued at $1,500. This was a cash crop for the Shakers as well as many upland farmers with slopes too steep to plow and covered with the maple trees which are a significant part of Massachusetts forests.

Manufacturing continued to grow. The Shakers' rake factory employed nine men and made thirty thousand rakes in 1865. Two paper mills employing 22 men and 41 women made more than $110,000 worth of paper. In addition, Tyringham townspeople worked in two blacksmith shops, a boot and shoe factory, and five sawmills.

After the Tyringham Shakers left in 1875, their businesses closed and their farms were sold. One Shaker family's buildings on Jerusalem Road became a summer resort known as Fernside.

Although far fewer in number than in the past, Tyringham remains an agricultural community that includes working farms. Woven Roots Farm is a "hand scale farm" that uses traditional farming practices in community-supported agriculture program. It also offers educational programming and community partnerships. Hav's Farm is a working dairy farm.

Geography

The town is four-sided, bordered by Lee to the north, Becket and Otis to the east, Monterey to the south, and Great Barrington to the west.

Tyringham is located in the Hop Brook Valley in the Berkshire Hills. To the northeast of the valley, Baldy Mountain rises to a large plateau which stretches into the neighboring towns, and includes Goose Pond. To the southwest of the valley, two mountain peaks—Mount Wilcot and Hunger Mountain—rise in a plateau in neighboring Monterey.

Tyringham is one of just fifteen towns in Massachusetts (and only two, along with Mount Washington, in Berkshire County) which is not served by any type of state route. Interstate 90 (the Massachusetts Turnpike) and U.S. Route 20 pass just north of the town's northeast corner, and Massachusetts Route 23 passes through neighboring Monterey to the south. The main road through town (named "Main Road") passes between this route to the south and Route 102 in Lee, just south of the point where it meets Route 20 at I-90 Exit 2. There are no rail or bus services in the town, with the nearest regional service for both being in Great Barrington. The nearest scheduled air service is at Bradley International Airport, near Hartford, Connecticut

Appalachian Trail

The Appalachian Trail passes through the town, a reflection of its remoteness. It winds down Sky Hill (a part of Mount Wilcot), then sweeps through the valley along Main Road, past the town center, leaving via Baldy Mountain and towards Becket Mountain. A pay telephone station for the hikers was installed near the Post Office. Informally, some residents on Main Road provide bed and breakfast, and hot showers, to hikers.

Climate

In a typical year, Tyringham, Massachusetts temperatures fall below 50F° for 205 days per year. Annual precipitation is typically 46.3 inches per year (high in the US) and snow covers the ground 69 days per year or 18.9% of the year (high in the US). It may be helpful to understand the yearly precipitation by imagining 9 straight days of moderate rain per year. The humidity is below 60% for approximately 18.4 days or 5.0% of the year.

Demographics

As of the census of 2000, there were 350 people, 133 households, and 98 families residing in the town. By population, the town ranks 30th out of 32 cities and towns in Berkshire County, and 345th out of the 351 in Massachusetts. The population density was 18.7 people per square mile (7.2/km), which ranks 28th in the county and 342nd in the Commonwealth. There were 265 housing units at an average density of 14.2 per square mile (5.5/km). The racial makeup of the town was 95.43% White, 0.29% African American, 0.29% Native American, 2.57% Asian, and 1.43% from two or more races. Hispanic or Latino of any race were 0.29% of the population.

There were 133 households, out of which 24.1% had children under the age of 18 living with them, 66.2% were married couples living together, 6.0% had a female householder with no husband present, and 25.6% were non-families. 20.3% of all households were made up of individuals, and 9.0% had someone living alone who was 65 years of age or older. The average household size was 2.56 and the average family size was 2.93.

In the town, the population was spread out, with 18.6% under the age of 18, 6.6% from 18 to 24, 18.9% from 25 to 44, 40.6% from 45 to 64, and 15.4% who were 65 years of age or older. The median age was 48 years. For every 100 females, there were 101.1 males. For every 100 females age 18 and over, there were 103.6 males.

The median income for a household in the town was $60,250, and the median income for a family was $67,679. Males had a median income of $42,708 versus $31,250 for females. The per capita income for the town was $35,503. None of the families and 3.5% of the population were living below the poverty line, including no under eighteens and none of those over 64.

Government

Tyringham uses the open town meeting form of government, and is led by a board of selectmen and an administrative assistant. The town has a police department, fire department and post office, as well as a library, which is adjacent to the town hall and is part of the regional library network. The nearest courthouses and hospital, Fairview Hospital, are located in Great Barrington.

On the state level, Tyringham is represented in the Massachusetts House of Representatives by the Fourth Berkshire district, which covers southern Berkshire County, as well as the westernmost towns in Hampden County. In the Massachusetts Senate, the town is represented by the Berkshire, Hampshire and Franklin district, which includes all of Berkshire County and western Hampshire and Franklin counties. The town is patrolled by the First (Lee) Station of Barracks "B" of the Massachusetts State Police.

On the national level, Tyringham is represented in the United States House of Representatives as part of Massachusetts's 1st congressional district, and has been represented by Richard Neal of Springfield since January 2013. Massachusetts is currently represented in the United States Senate by senior Senator Elizabeth Warren and junior Senator Ed Markey

Business

In 2000 there are no stores or other businesses in Tyringham. Near the Post Office is a small plaza of shuttered storefronts and stables. There is a library staffed by volunteers, and a congregational church. The only jobs are part-time: at the Post Office and for the town government (fire, police, maintenance of roads and records). The installation of a soda vending machine inside the fire station was the subject of much local comment. Many residents are commuters from jobs in Lee, Great Barrington, or Pittsfield. Some residents free-lance plowing snow in winter.

Education

Tyringham students are sent to Lee Public Schools by arrangement with that adjacent town. Lee Elementary School serves students from pre-kindergarten through sixth grades, and the Lee Middle and High School serves students from seventh through twelfth grades. Additionally, neighboring Lee is home to Saint Mary's School, a parochial school which serves students through eighth grade. Other private schools can be found in Great Barrington and other surrounding towns.

The nearest community college is the South County Center of Berkshire Community College in Great Barrington  The nearest state college is Westfield State University. The nearest private college is Bard College at Simon's Rock, in Great Barrington, the only college in the country that focuses on excellent young students who do not need to finish high school.

Points of interest
 Santarella, also called "The Gingerbread House", home of sculptor Henry Hudson Kitson
 Tyringham Shaker Settlement Historic District
 Ashintully Gardens
 Tyringham Cobble

Notable people

 Brooke Astor owned a home in Tyringham with her husband Buddie Marshall, selling it following his death and before she became Mrs. Astor.
 Grover Cleveland, U.S. President, spent time in Tyringham, enjoying fishing in the Hop Brook. In 1901, he was arrested and fined $2 for catching too many fish.
 Maria Cole, widow of Nat "King" Cole, moved to Tyringham five years after his death.
 Kitty Dukakis owned a home used as a vacation retreat for her husband, former governor Michael Dukakis.
 George Gilder, investor, writer, economist, techno-utopian advocate; spent most of his childhood with his mother, Anne Spring (Alsop), and his stepfather, Gilder Palmer, on a dairy farm in Tyringham, where he still lives.
 Rutherford B. Hayes, U. S. President; spent part of a summer in Tyringham, staying at a large house just to the north of the village that took in boarders, claiming their team met every train in Lee.
 Sidney Howard, playwright and screenwriter; lived and died in Tyringham. Howard was the major screenwriter for David O. Selznick's 1939 epic Gone with the Wind
 Yo-Yo Ma, Classical musician; has a residence in Tyringham and spends much of his time in the town.
 William Roerick, actor; lived at his Lost Farm homestead in Tyringham; among the various visitors was E. M. Forster, who dedicated his last book, Two Cheers for Democracy to "William Roerick and 'The Lost Farm' in Tyringham, Massachusetts."
 Mark Twain, writer; was a frequent visitor to Tyringham as the guest of Richard Watson Gilder and Helena de Kay Gilder. He spent a summer in Tyringham following the death of his daughter.
 Sir Brian Urquhart, British diplomat and United Nations official; lived and died in the town.

References

 
Towns in Berkshire County, Massachusetts
Towns in Massachusetts